Sterrhosia is a genus of moths in the subfamily Arctiinae. It contains the single species Sterrhosia zonata, which is found in Vietnam.

References

Natural History Museum Lepidoptera generic names catalog

Lithosiini